The Rim of the World Scenic Byway is an  National Forest Scenic Byway through the San Bernardino National Forest in the U.S. state of California. It consists of the following routes:

California State Route 138 from near the Cajon Pass to near Crestline 
California State Route 18 from near Crestline to Big Bear Dam
California State Route 38 from Big Bear Dam to the San Bernardino National Forest boundary near Mill Creek Canyon

References

State Scenic Highway System (California)
National Forest Scenic Byways
San Bernardino National Forest
Roads in San Bernardino County, California
Named highways in California